Delfín Gallo (November 25, 1845 – December 8, 1889) was an Argentine politician and journalist.

He was born in San Miguel de Tucumán to a family with connections to the Tucumán oligarchy, and studied under Amédée Jacques at the Colegio San Miguel.

In 1867, he received a license to practice law in Buenos Aires. He later pursued a career in journalism in publications such as La Prensa, El Nacional, and SudAmérica, which he founded along with his brother in law Carlos Pellegrini and Lucio V. López.

He represented Tucumán as a national deputy from 1872 to 1876 and from 1884 to 1888; between 1876 and 1884, he represented Buenos Aires. A great parliamentary orator, he is remembered especially for his vigorous condemnation of the overthrow of Tucumanian governor Juan Posse in 1887. He served as undersecretary of justice and public education during the administration of Nicolás Avellaneda. He sat on the board of directors of the Western and Pacific Railroads, and presided over the National Real-estate Bank.

On September 1, 1889, during the run-up to the Revolution of the Park, Gallo spoke at the great meeting of the Jardín Florida, which gave rise to the Civic Youth Union. Less than four months later, he died in Buenos Aires.

References

1845 births
1889 deaths
Members of the Argentine Chamber of Deputies elected in Tucumán
People from San Miguel de Tucumán